Ciudad Jardín Lomas del Palomar is a planned community, part of the partido of Tres de Febrero in Greater Buenos Aires and adjacent to the city of El Palomar.

Urban character
Inspired by the Garden city movement, its layout is designed on a pedestrian scale with compact residential areas made up of tile roofed row style and free standing chalets in tree-lined streets and boulevards. There are three arcaded three-storey residential-commercial plazas (town squares) with central greenery, children playgrounds, fountains and surrounded by shops, pubs and al fresco dining restaurants.

The layout was developed to place cultural facilities, schools, churches, clubs and parks, mixed and within walking distance of housing areas. There are a number of public plazas and plazoletas (mini plazas) that are generally surrounded by restaurants and other businesses. The gastronomy in Ciudad Jardin is first class, featuring authentic ethnic food including Japanese, Chinese, Italian, and German cuisine among others.

In part of the city there is a large part of the Colegio Militar de la Nacion, including the National Historic Monument, El Palomar de Casero and the Casa de Diego Casero that were the epicenter of the Battle of Caseros and of the preliminary negotiations of the Pact of San José de Flores.

History
Inaugurated in 1944, Ciudad Jardín was conceived by Erich Zeyen, a German emigrant who arrived in 1929 with the idea of creating a Garden City that offered a balance of urban life with green spaces, a city within a city. It has been recognized and mentioned in publications on urban planning on a worldwide level.

Carlos María della Paolera, founder of "Día Mundial del Urbanismo" (World Urbanism Day), has praised Ciudad Jardín as the first Garden City in South America.

Ciudad Jardín's citizens are debating whether a highway with direct links to an expressway should be built. There is a concern that the proposal would ruin the community's character and put it in jeopardy. It is argued that a better approach would be to improve the run-down commuter San Martín rail line that runs parallel to the proposed highway.

Rock 'n Roll City
Ciudad Jardín has produced national and internationally known celebrities, and is a cradle of important musicians of jazz and rock music groups. Gustavo Santaolalla, Javier and Walter Malosetti (jazz), Ricardo Pellican, Los Piojos, MAM, Divididos, Feroz, Arco Iris, (Gustavo Santaolalla's band), Caballeros de la Quema (some of its ex members) and Sumo have all lived or participated in the community. Andres "Ciro" Martinez, frontman of Los Piojos and one of the most popular musicians in the country, currently lives in Ciudad Jardin. 
The city is also home to a vibrant music scene today, with a number of locations at which local bands can perform for their neighbors. The Plaza de los Aviadores, the central plaza, has featured musical and cultural acts.

Battle of Caseros
In 1852 the area was the site of the Battle of Caseros, between the Army of Buenos Aires commanded by Juan Manuel de Rosas and the Grand Army (Ejército Grande) led by Justo José de Urquiza.

Notable residents
 Ángel Lo Valvo
 Sebastián Prieto
 Luis Scola
 Jorge Donn
 Hilda Molina
 Adolf Galland
 Gustavo Santaolalla
 León Gieco
 Francisco Benkö
 Heinrich Reinhardt
 Jorge Olguin
 Saskia Sassen
 Enio Iommi
 Kurt Pahlen
 Alejandro Lanari
 Gerardo Bönnhoff

Notable visitors
 Juan Manuel Fangio
 Guillermo Vilas
 Andrea de Cesaris
 Virginia Ruano Pascual
 Bobby Fischer
 Esteban Tuero
 Mercedes Sosa
 Hermann Lang
 Karl Kling
 Werner Baumbach
 Hans-Ulrich Rudel
 José Pékerman
 Miguel Najdorf

In Media 
 The songs Esquina Libertad, and Buenos Dias Palomar, of the local band Los Piojos, talk about the city.
 The song Mañana campestre of the local band Arco Iris, is inspired by the city.
 The film Extraña invasión it was filmed entirely in the city in 1965.
 The film Terrified it was filmed entirely in the city in 2017.

See also

 Béccar, San Isidro
 Garden city movement
 Gartenstadt (in the German Wikipedia)
 Urbanism
 World Urbanism Day

References

External links 
 www.guiapalomar.com (Official website)
 ciudad-jardin.com

Tres de Febrero Partido
Populated places in Buenos Aires Province
Urban planning in Argentina
Planned communities
Planned cities
Cities in Argentina

it:El Palomar (Argentina)
nl:El Palomar (Buenos Aires)
sr:Palomar